Ubiquinol-cytochrome c reductase complex (7.2 kD), also known as UCRC or UQCR10, is a human gene.

Its gene product is a subunit of the respiratory chain protein Ubiquinol Cytochrome c Reductase (UQCR, Complex III or Cytochrome bc1 complex), which consists of the products of one mitochondrially encoded gene, MTCYTB (mitochondrial cytochrome b) and ten nuclear genes: UQCRC1, UQCRC2, Cytochrome c1, UQCRFS1 (Rieske protein), UQCRB, UQCRQ ("11kDa protein"), UQCRH (cyt c1 Hinge protein), Rieske Protein presequence, UCRC("cyt. c1 associated protein"), and UQCR ("Rieske-associated protein").

References

Further reading